This is a list of sovereign states in the 1900s, giving an overview of states around the world during the period between 1 January 1900 and 31 December 1909. It contains entries, arranged alphabetically, with information on the status and recognition of their sovereignty. It includes widely recognized sovereign states, and entities which were de facto sovereign but which were not widely recognized by other states.

Sovereign states

Notes

References

1900-1909
1900s politics-related lists